A Vitruvian opening is a window or frame that is slightly larger at the bottom than the top. 

The term was first described by Vitruvius and mentioned by Andrea Palladio, referring to a window at the Temple of Vesta at Tivoli. The term Tivoli window is also used.

References

Windows
Ancient Roman architectural elements
Palladian architecture